Grevillea oldei is a species of flowering plant in the family Proteaceae and is endemic to a small area of eastern New South Wales. It is a diffuse shrub with narrowly egg-shaped to more or less triangular leaves, and red flowers.

Description
It often has arching branches and shaggy-hairy branchlets. The lower surface of the leaves is covered with loose, untidy, shaggy hairs.

Plants of this species have previously been misidentified as either [[Grevillea juniperina|Grevillea juniperina subsp trinervis]] or G. capitellata.

TaxonomyGrevillea oldei was first formally described in 1986 by Donald McGillivray in his book New Names in Grevillea (Proteaceae) from specimens collected by Charles William Edwin (Ted) Moore near Ourimbah in 1972. The specific epithet (oldei'') honours Peter M. Olde.

Distribution and habitat
This grevillea grows in woodland or heath between Mangrove Mountain and Woy Woy in eastern New South Wales.

References

oldei
Flora of New South Wales
Proteales of Australia
Taxa named by Donald McGillivray
Plants described in 1986